Bjørn Spydevold (8 September 1918 – 30 March 2002) was a Norwegian football player. He was born in Sarpsborg, and played for the sports club Fredrikstad FK. He played for the Norwegian national team at the 1952 Summer Olympics in Helsinki. He was capped 37 times for Norway between 1946 and 1953, scoring one goal.

He was the father of Thor, Knut and Bjørnar Spydevold.

References

External links

1918 births
2002 deaths
People from Sarpsborg
Norwegian footballers
Norway international footballers
Fredrikstad FK players
Footballers at the 1952 Summer Olympics
Olympic footballers of Norway
Norwegian football managers
Association football midfielders
Sportspeople from Viken (county)